Alexis Guérin (born 5 August 2000) is a French footballer who plays as a midfielder for Swiss club Stade Nyonnais on loan from Servette FC.

Professional career
Guérin made his professional debut with Servette FC in a 3–1 Swiss Super League loss to FC Lugano on 31 July 2020.

References

External links
 
 SFL Profile
 OL Profile

2000 births
Sportspeople from Le Creusot
Living people
French footballers
Association football midfielders
Football Bourg-en-Bresse Péronnas 01 players
FC Montceau Bourgogne players
Servette FC players
FC Stade Nyonnais players
Championnat National 3 players
Swiss Super League players
2. Liga Interregional players
Swiss Promotion League players
French expatriate footballers
French expatriate sportspeople in Switzerland
Expatriate footballers in Switzerland
Footballers from Bourgogne-Franche-Comté